The following are notable people associated with the name Waite.

Surname 

 Arthur Edward Waite, occultist and co-creator of the Rider-Waite tarot deck
 Arthur Waite (racing driver), Australian racing driver
 Catharine Van Valkenburg Waite, United States author, lawyer and women's suffrage activist.
 Charles Betts "C. B." Waite, American photographer
 Charles Burlingame Waite, American jurist and author
 David Waite, Australian rugby league coach
 Davis Hanson Waite (1825-1901), Populist governor of Colorado
 Edgar Ravenswood Waite, Australian zoologist 
 Harold Roy Waite (1884-1978), American aviator
 Henry Chester Waite (1830-1912), American lawyer, banker, and politician
 Jamie Waite (born 1986), Thai footballer
 Jimmy Waite, ice hockey goaltender
 John Waite, British rock singer
 John Waite (cricketer), South African wicketkeeper–opening batsman
 John Musgrave Waite (1820-1884), Victorian fencing master
 Joseph Waite (alive in 1893 in England), a Latin and Greek scholar who edited the book Latin and Greek verse by Thomas Saunders Evans
 Keith Waite (1927–2014), New Zealand-born English editorial cartoonist
 Mitchell Waite (born 1946), author of books on electronics and computing
 Morrison Waite (1816-1888), U.S. Supreme Court Justice, 1874–1888
 Norman Waite (1898–1970), English footballer
 Peter Waite (1834–1922), South Australian pastoralist, businessman, company director and philanthropist
 Ralph Waite (1928–2014), American actor, best known for the role of John Walton on the TV series The Waltons
 Reginald Waite, Royal Air Force officer
 Terry Waite, British humanitarian and author
 Thomas Waite (regicide), English Member of Parliament and one of the regicides of King Charles I
 Thomas Waite (Under-Secretary for Ireland), 1747–1774
 Tommy Waite (born 1972), Northern Irish boxer of the 1990s and 2000s

Given name
Waite Hoyt, American baseball player
Waite Phillips, American Petroleum Businessman, Philanthropist
Waite Stirling, First Anglican Bishop of the Falkland Islands.

Fictional characters
 Asenath Waite, character in H.P. Lovecraft's The Thing on the Doorstep
 Ephraim Waite, character in H.P. Lovecraft's The Thing on the Doorstep

See also
Weight (surname)
Waite (disambiguation)

English-language surnames